Amata elongimacula is a species of moth of the family Erebidae first described by George Hampson in 1898. It is found on Borneo (Pulo Laut).

References 

Elongim
Moths of Borneo
Moths described in 1898